Sankaran "Thai" Thayumanavan is an Indian-American chemist, who is currently a Distinguished Professor of Chemistry at the University of Massachusetts Amherst. He is known for his work in polymer chemistry. He is a Fellow of the American Association for the Advancement of Science (AAAS).

Early life and education 
Thayumanavan grew up in the cities of Tirunelveli and Madurai in the southern state of Tamil Nadu in India.  He obtained his B.Sc. (1987) and M.Sc. (1989) degrees in the American College, Madurai, India. He was awarded his Ph.D. in organic chemistry at the University of Illinois at Urbana–Champaign in 1996. His postdoctoral work was carried out with Seth Marder at the California Institute of Technology.

Career 
Thayumanavan started his academic career as a faculty member at Tulane University. He moved to the University of Massachusetts Amherst in 2003, where he is currently a Distinguished Professor in the Chemistry Department and Biomedical Engineering Department. He is also the Director of the Center for Bioactive Delivery at the Institute for Applied Life Sciences. In 2010 he was elected a Fellow of the AAAS "for distinguished contributions to supramolecular polymer chemistry".

 Thayumanavan’s early work involved contributions to the design, syntheses, and self-assembly behavior of amphiphilic homopolymers. His research in molecular design principles from physical organic chemistry to synthetic chemistry and supramolecular polymer chemistry for applications in materials and biomedicine.

Awards 
 2010 – Elected Fellow of the American Association for the Advancement of Science
 2014 – Chancellor’s Medal, UMass
 2016 – Chemical Research Society of India Medal
 2019 – Distinguished Graduate Mentor Award
 2019 – Mahoney Life Sciences Prize

Selected publications

References 

Year of birth missing (living people)
Living people
Place of birth missing (living people)
University of Illinois Urbana-Champaign alumni
California Institute of Technology alumni
Tulane University faculty
University of Massachusetts Amherst faculty